The Journal of Media Business Studies is a quarterly peer-reviewed academic journal that covers business aspects of media enterprises. Aspects including media economics, strategic management, marketing, entrepreneurship , and finance . The journal was established in 2004 by founding editor-in-chief Robert G. Picard, and is published by Taylor & Francis. It is associated with the European Media Management Association. The editor-in-chief is Leona Achtenhagen Jönköping University.

The journal is abstracted and indexed in EBSCO Business Source Complete, CIOS, and Communications Abstracts.

External links 
 
 

Works about media industries
Business and management journals
Works about the information economy
Publications established in 2004
Quarterly journals
English-language journals